John Hulst was a lake freighter. She was one of four vessel of the Governor Miller Class which includes the museum ship SS William A. Irvin. She sailed from 1938 to 1983 and was operated by the Pittsburgh Steamship Company (later United States Steel Corporation.

References 

 
 
 

1938 ships
Great Lakes freighters
Ships built in Ecorse, Michigan